Greg Jones (born 20 February 1970) is a former Australian rules footballer who played for St Kilda in the Australian Football League (AFL) in 1991. He was recruited from the Swan Districts Football Club in the West Australian Football League (WAFL) with the 49th selection in the 1989 VFL Draft.

References

External links

Living people
1970 births
St Kilda Football Club players
Swan Districts Football Club players
Australian rules footballers from Western Australia